The following is a list of Malayalam films released in the year 1981.

Dubbed films

References

 1981
1981
Malayalam
Fil